Kryptoperidinium is a genus of dinoflagellates belonging to the family Peridiniaceae.

The genus has cosmopolitan distribution.

Species:
 Kryptoperidinium foliaceum (F.Stein) Er.Lindem.

References

Dinophyceae
Dinoflagellate genera